Bouloc is the name or part of the name of the following communes in France:

 Bouloc, Haute-Garonne, in the Haute-Garonne department
 Bouloc, Tarn-et-Garonne, in the Tarn-et-Garonne department
 Villeneuve-lès-Bouloc, in the Haute-Garonne department